Bengabad is a village in the Bengabad CD block in the Giridih Sadar subdivision of  the Giridih district in the Indian state of Jharkhand.

Geography

Location

Area overview
Giridih district is a part of the Chota Nagpur plateau, with rocky soil and extensive forests. Most of the rivers in the district flow from the west to east, except in the northern portion where the rivers flow north and north west. The district has coal and mica mines. It is an overwhelmingly rural district with small pockets of urbanisation. 

Note: The map alongside presents some of the notable locations in the district. All places marked in the map are linked in the larger full screen map.

Demographics
According to the 2011 Census of India, Bengabad had a total population of 3,178, of which 1,520 (48%) were males and 1,658 (52%) were females. Population in the age range 0-6 years was 459. The total number of literate persons in Bengabad was 2,194 (80.69% of the population over 6 years).

Civic administration

Police station
Bengabad police station has jurisdiction over  Bengabad CD block. According to old British records, Bengabad PS was there after Giridh subdivision was formed in 1870.

CD block HQ
The headquarters of Bengabad CD block are located at Bengabad.

Transport
National Highway 114A passes through Bengabad.

References

Villages in Giridih district